The 2022 Toledo Rockets football team represented the University of Toledo during the 2022 NCAA Division I FBS football season. The Rockets were led by seventh-year head coach Jason Candle and played their home games at the Glass Bowl in Toledo, Ohio. They competed as members of the West Division of the Mid-American Conference (MAC).

Previous season

The Rockets finished the 2021 Toledo Rockets football team 7–6 and 5-3 in the MAC to finish in third place in the West Division. They lost the Bahamas Bowl to Middle Tennessee.

Offseason

Recruiting class

Transfer portal

Outgoing transfers

Incoming transfers 
Toledo has collected ten players from the transfer portal.

Schedule

References

Toledo
Toledo Rockets football seasons
Mid-American Conference football champion seasons
Boca Raton Bowl champion seasons
Toledo Football